Pirog (pl. pirogi пироги ; ; ; , pl. pīrāgi;  pyrih, pl. pyrohy пироги; , pl. pyragai) is a baked case of dough with either sweet or savory filling. The dish is common in Eastern European cuisines. Pirogi (pl.) are characterized as "ubiquitous in Russian life" and "the most popular and important dish" and "truly national goods" of Russian cuisine.

The name is derived from the ancient Proto-Slavic word pir, meaning "banquet" or "festivity". The Russian plural, pirogi (with the stress on the last syllable), should not be confused with pierogi (stress on "ro" in Polish and English) in Polish cuisine, which are dumplings similar to Russian pelmeni or Ukrainian varenyky.

Shape
Pirogi come in different shapes and forms: they are often oblong with tapering ends, but can also be circular or rectangular. They can be closed or open-faced with no crust on top.

Dough
Pirogi are usually made from yeast-raised dough, which distinguishes them from pies and pastries common in other cuisines. In former times, the dough for Russian pirogi was made predominantly of rye flour. Later it was mixed with wheat flour. Nowadays, mainly wheat flour is used.

There are also variants made from shortcrust, flaky or puff pastry. In East-Slavic languages, pirog is a generic term which denotes virtually any kind of pie, pastry, or cake. Тhus, Karelian pastry (known as Karelian pirog in Russian), Jewish knish or charlotte cake are considered types of pirog in Eastern Europe.

Filling
The filling for pirogi may be sweet and contain tvorog  or cottage cheese, fruits like apples, plums or various berries, as well as honey, nuts or poppy seeds. Savory versions may consist of meat, fish, mushrooms, cabbage, rice, buckwheat groats, or potato. In Ukrainian and Russian cuisines, pirogi (as well as their smaller versions called pirozhki) with a savory filling are traditionally served as an accompaniment with clear borscht, broth, or consommé.

Types
Certain types of pirog are known by different names:
 Coulibiac, a middle-size Russian pirog of oblong shape with a complex filling;
 Kurnik ("chicken pirog"), also known as wedding pirog or tsar pirog, a dome-shaped savory Russian pirog, usually filled with chicken, eggs, onions, kasha or rice, and other optional components;
 Poppy seed roll and nut roll, popular throughout Central and Eastern Europe, are considered types of pirog in Eastern Europe;
 Pirozhki (Russian diminutive, literally "small pirogi") or pyrizhky (Ukrainian), individual-sized buns that can be eaten with one hand;
 Rasstegai ("unbuttoned pirog"), a type of Russian pirog with a hole in the top;
 Shanga, a small or medium-size open-faced circular savory pirog endemic to and widespread in Ural and Siberia; "Shanga is a bakery product made of unleavened or yeast, wheat, rye or rye-wheat dough. The dish is of Finno-Ugric origin, spread from Karelia to the Ob, including the Russian North. It is part of the national cuisines: Komi cuisine, Mari cuisine, North Russian cuisine, Udmurt cuisine."
 Vatrushka, a small sweet pirog, popular in all Eastern Slavic cuisines, formed as a ring of dough with quark in the middle.

Similar West Slavic pastries, such as Czech and Slovak Kolach, and Polish Kołacz, usually have sweet fillings.

See also
 Bierock or runza
 List of Russian dishes
 Khachapuri

References

Belarusian cuisine
Belarusian desserts
Russian cuisine
Russian desserts
Swedish pastries
Ukrainian cuisine
Savoury pies
Sweet pies
National dishes